Rashk-e Sofla or Rashk Sofla may refer to:
 Rashk-e Sofla, Fars ( - Rāshk-e Soflá)
 Rashk-e Sofla, Kerman ( - Rashk-e Soflá)